The Snow Has Melted on the Manicouagan is a Canadian dramatic docufiction film, directed by Arthur Lamothe and released in 1965. The film stars Monique Miller as a woman who is torn between the love of her husband (Jean Doyon) and her desire to escape the dreariness and tedium of their isolated life in rural northern Quebec where he works as a maintenance engineer on the Daniel-Johnson Dam.

The cast also includes Margot Campbell and singer-songwriter Gilles Vigneault in supporting roles. The film is historically most noted for "Mon Pays", Vigneault's most famous song and a classic of Quebec music, which was introduced as the film's theme song.

The film premiered at the 1965 Montreal International Film Festival.

References

External links
 

1965 films
1965 drama films
Canadian docufiction films
Canadian drama films
Films directed by Arthur Lamothe
Films set in Quebec
Films shot in Quebec
1960s French-language films
French-language Canadian films
National Film Board of Canada films
1960s Canadian films